The stability of the Solar System is a subject of much inquiry in astronomy. Though the planets have been stable when historically observed, and will be in the short term, their weak gravitational effects on one another can add up in unpredictable ways.

For this reason (among others), the Solar System is chaotic in the technical sense of mathematical chaos theory, and even the most precise long-term models for the orbital motion of the Solar System are not valid over more than a few tens of millions of years.

The Solar System is stable in human terms, and far beyond, given that it is unlikely any of the planets will collide with each other or be ejected from the system in the next few billion years, and that Earth's orbit will be relatively stable.

Since Newton's law of gravitation (1687), mathematicians and astronomers (such as Pierre-Simon Laplace, Joseph Louis Lagrange, Carl Friedrich Gauss, Henri Poincaré, Andrey Kolmogorov, Vladimir Arnold, and Jürgen Moser) have searched for evidence for the stability of the planetary motions, and this quest led to many mathematical developments and several successive "proofs" of stability of the Solar System.

Overview and challenges 

The orbits of the planets are open to long-term variations. Modeling the Solar System is a case of the n-body problem of physics, which is generally unsolvable except by numerical simulation.

Resonance 

An orbital resonance happens when any two periods have a simple numerical ratio. The most fundamental period for an object in the Solar System is its orbital period, and orbital resonances pervade the Solar System. In 1867, the American astronomer Daniel Kirkwood noticed that asteroids in the asteroid belt are not randomly distributed. There were distinct gaps in the belt at locations that corresponded to resonances with Jupiter. These are now known as the Kirkwood gaps. Some asteroids were later discovered to orbit in these gaps, but their orbits are unstable and they will eventually break out of the resonance due to close encounters with a major planet.

Another common form of resonance in the Solar System is spin–orbit resonance, where the rotation period (the time it takes the planet or moon to rotate once about its axis) has a simple numerical relationship with its orbital period. An example is the Moon, which is in a 1:1 spin–orbit resonance that keeps its far side away from Earth. (This feature is also known as "tidal locking.") Another example is Mercury, which is in a 3:2 spin–orbit resonance with the Sun.

Predictability 
The planets' orbits are chaotic over longer timescales, in such a way that the whole Solar System possesses a Lyapunov time in the range of 2–230 million years. In all cases, this means that the position of a planet along its orbit ultimately becomes impossible to predict with any certainty. In some cases, the orbits themselves may change dramatically. Such chaos manifests most strongly as changes in eccentricity, with some planets' orbits becoming significantly more — or less — elliptical.

In calculation, the unknowns include asteroids, the solar quadrupole moment, mass loss from the Sun through radiation and solar wind, drag of solar wind on planetary magnetospheres, galactic tidal forces, and effects from passing stars.

Scenarios

Neptune–Pluto resonance 
The Neptune–Pluto system lies in a 3:2 orbital resonance. C.J. Cohen and E.C. Hubbard at the Naval Surface Warfare Center Dahlgren Division discovered this in 1965. Although the resonance itself will remain stable in the short term, it becomes impossible to predict the position of Pluto with any degree of accuracy, as the uncertainty in the position grows by a factor e with each Lyapunov time, which for Pluto is 10–20 million years into the future.
Thus, on the time scale of hundreds of millions of years Pluto's orbital phase becomes impossible to determine, even if Pluto's orbit appears to be perfectly stable on 10 MYR time scales (Ito and Tanikawa 2002, MNRAS).

Mercury–Jupiter 1:1 perihelion-precession resonance
The planet Mercury is especially susceptible to Jupiter's influence because of a small celestial coincidence: Mercury's perihelion, the point where it gets closest to the Sun, precesses at a rate of about 1.5 degrees every 1,000 years, and Jupiter's perihelion precesses only a little slower. At one point, the two may fall into sync, at which time Jupiter's constant gravitational tugs could accumulate and pull Mercury off course with 1–2% probability, 3–4 billion years into the future. This could eject it from the Solar System altogether or send it on a collision course with Venus, the Sun, or Earth.

Mercury's perihelion precession rate is dominated by planet-planet interactions, but about 7.5% of Mercury's perihelion precession rate comes from the effects described by general relativity. The work by Laskar and Gastineau (described below) showed the importance of general relativity in long-term Solar System stability. Specifically, without GR the instability rate of Mercury would be 60 times higher than with GR. By modelling the instability time of Mercury as a one-dimensional Fokker–Planck diffusion process, the relationship between the instability time of Mercury and the Mercury-Jupiter 1:1 perihelion-precession resonance can be investigated statistically. This diffusion model shows that GR not only distances Mercury and Jupiter from falling into a 1:1 resonance, but also decreases the rate at which Mercury diffuses through phase space. Thus, not only does GR decrease the likelihood of Mercury's instability, but also extends the time at which it is likely to occur.

Galilean moon resonance
Jupiter's Galilean moons experience strong tidal dissipation and mutual interactions due to their size and proximity to Jupiter. Currently, Io, Europa, and Ganymede are in a 4:2:1 Laplace resonance with each other, with each moon completing two orbits for every orbit of the next. In around 1.5 billion years, outward migration of these moons will trap the fourth and outermost moon, Callisto, into another 2:1 resonance with Ganymede. This 8:4:2:1 resonance will cause Callisto to migrate outward, and it may remain stable with approximately 56% probability, or become disrupted with Io usually exiting the chain.

Chaos from geological processes
Another example is Earth's axial tilt, which, due to friction raised within Earth's mantle by tidal interactions with the Moon, will be rendered chaotic between 1.5 and 4.5 billion years from now.

External influences 
Objects coming from outside the Solar System can also affect it. Though they are not technically part of the solar system for the purposes of studying the system's intrinsic stability, they nevertheless can change it. Unfortunately, predicting the potential influences of these extrasolar objects is even more difficult than predicting the influences of objects within the system simply because of the sheer distances involved. Among the known objects with a potential to significantly impact the Solar System is the star Gliese 710, which is expected to pass near the system in approximately 1.281 million years. Though the star is not expected to substantially affect the orbits of the major planets, it could substantially disrupt the Oort cloud, potentially causing major comet activity throughout the solar system. There are at least a dozen other stars that have a potential to make a close approach in the next few million years. In 2022, Garett Brown and Hanno Rein of the University of Toronto published a study exploring the long-term stability of the Solar System in the presence of weak perturbations from stellar flybys. They determined that if a passing star altered the semi-major axis of Neptune by at least 0.03 AU (4.49 million km; 2.79 million mi) it would increase the chance of instability by 10 times over the subsequent 5 billion years. They also estimated that a flyby of this magnitude is not likely to occur for 100 billion years.

Studies

LONGSTOP
Project LONGSTOP (Long-term Gravitational Study of the Outer Planets) was a 1982 international consortium of Solar System dynamicists led by Archie Roy. It involved creation of a model on a supercomputer, integrating the orbits of (only) the outer planets. Its results revealed several curious exchanges of energy between the outer planets, but no signs of gross instability.

Digital Orrery
Another project involved constructing the Digital Orrery by Gerry Sussman and his MIT group in 1988. The group used a supercomputer to integrate the orbits of the outer planets over 845 million years (some 20 percent of the age of the Solar System). In 1988, Sussman and Wisdom found data using the Orrery that revealed that Pluto's orbit shows signs of chaos, due in part to its peculiar resonance with Neptune.

If Pluto's orbit is chaotic, then technically the whole Solar System is chaotic, because each body, even one as small as Pluto, affects the others to some extent through gravitational interactions.

Laskar 1
In 1989, Jacques Laskar of the Bureau des Longitudes in Paris published the results of his numerical integration of the Solar System over 200 million years. These were not the full equations of motion, but rather averaged equations along the lines of those used by Laplace. Laskar's work showed that the Earth's orbit (as well as the orbits of all the inner planets) is chaotic and that an error as small as 15 metres in measuring the position of the Earth today would make it impossible to predict where the Earth would be in its orbit in just over 100 million years' time.

Laskar and Gastineau
Jacques Laskar and his colleague Mickaël Gastineau in 2008 took a more thorough approach by directly simulating 2,501 possible futures. In 20 cases, Mercury goes into a dangerous orbit and often ends up colliding with Venus or plunging into the Sun. Moving in such a warped orbit, Mercury's gravity is more likely to shake other planets out of their settled paths: In one simulated case, Mercury's perturbations sent Mars heading toward Earth.

Batygin and Laughlin 
Independently of Laskar and Gastineau, Batygin  and Laughlin were also directly simulating the Solar System 20 billion years into the future. Their results reached the same basic conclusions of Laskar and Gastineau, while additionally providing a lower bound of a billion years on the dynamical lifespan of the Solar System.

Brown and Rein 
In 2020, Garett Brown and Hanno Rein of the University of Toronto published the results of their numerical integration of the Solar System over 5 billion years.

See also
Clearing the neighbourhood
Future of Earth
Global catastrophic risk
Resonant trans-Neptunian object

References

External links

Long Shot: Planet Could Hit Earth in Distant Future Space.com.
Project LONGSTOP - Long-term Gravitational Study of the Outer Planets

Chaos theory
Dynamics of the Solar System
Orbital perturbations